The Oregon Constitutional Convention in 1857 drafted the Oregon Constitution in preparation for the Oregon Territory to become a U.S. state. Held from mid-August through September, 60 men met in Salem, Oregon, and created the foundation for Oregon's law. The proposal passed with a vote of 35 for adoption to 10 against. Oregon then became the 33rd state of the Union on February 14, 1859.

History

Background

In June 1846 the Oregon Question was decided with the United States gaining sole possession of all disputed land south of the 49th degree of latitude. Afterward, on August 14, 1848, the United States government created the Oregon Territory, and in 1853 the northern and eastern sections of the territory became the Washington Territory. In 1854 and 1855 bills in the Territorial Legislature pressing for statehood for the territory were defeated.

Finally on December 12, 1856, the legislature passed a bill authorizing a convention to establish a constitution. On June 1, 1857, the voters in the territory approved the resolution and elected delegates to a constitutional convention. The vote was 7,209 in favor of holding a convention to 1,616 against the proposal.

Convention

On August 17, 1857, 60 delegates selected by the voters met in Salem to write a state constitution in preparation of statehood. The convention assembled at the Salem Courthouse, with Asa Lovejoy named president pro tem of the gathering. On the following day Judge Matthew Deady was elected the permanent president of the convention.

The delegates selected officers, set up rules for the meeting (a total of 45 in all), and divided into committees on various subjects such as military, judicial, legislative, and elections. At the convention, Chester N. Terry was elected as the secretary of the group, while several people served at different times as the chairperson including Lovejoy, William W. Bristow, Delazon Smith, and La Fayette Grover. The group also settled the debate over a disputed seat at the convention in favor of Perry B. Marple over F. G. Lockhart to represent Coos County.

Thirty-four of the delegates were farmers, while 18 were lawyers, including the three justices of the Oregon Supreme Court. Two of the delegates were newspaper editors, five were miners, and another was a civil engineer.

The main debates concerning a constitution revolved around slavery and the exclusion of Blacks, liquor laws, and what would be the boundaries of the new state. After meeting for 31 days, the convention ended on September 18, when the delegates voted to approve the document as the constitution. The final tally was 35 votes for passage and 10 against; 15 members of the convention were absent and did not vote.

Draft Constitution

The document approved by the convention was modeled after Indiana's 1851 Constitution and included a provision that denied the right to vote to "negro, Chinaman or mulatto" citizens in the state to be, and though female suffrage was discussed, women were also denied the right to vote, as was typical of the era.

Provision was made for the ability of the legislature to regulate the immigration into the state of "persons not qualified to become citizens of the United States," thereby allowing legislative restriction of the number of free blacks coming into the state in the event that an outright ban did not achieve majority approval. Another section forbade any "Chinaman" who immigrated into the state after adoption of the constitution from ever owning real estate or working a mining claim, expressly giving the legislature power to enforce this provision.

Even as far back as the 1880s such racial measures were regarded as socially retrograde, with historian Hubert Howe Bancroft remarking:

These proscriptive clauses, however they may appear in later times, were in accordance with the popular sentiment on the Pacific coast and throughout a large portion of the United States ... However that may be, the founders of the state government in Oregon were fully determined to indulge themselves in their prejudices against color, and the qualities which accompany the black and yellow skinned races.

The final draft submitted to the populace contained a total of 18 articles. Over half of the document's content was derived in part from the Indiana constitution.

Members

Of the 60 delegates in the convention, exactly half were farmers and an additional 19 were lawyers. All members of the convention and what county they represented:

Levi Anderson, Washington
Jesse Applegate, Umpqua
Avery D. Babcock, Polk & Tillamook
Reuben P. Boise, Polk
Jonathan H. Brattain, Linn
Paul Brattain, Lane
William W. Bristow, Lane
Benjamin Franklin Burch, Polk
Andrew J. Campbell, Lane
Hector Campbell, Lane
Stephen F. Chadwick, Douglas
Jesse Cox, Lane
Joseph Cox, Marion
Reuben Coyle, Linn
John T. Crooks, Linn
Matthew P. Deady, Douglas
Thomas Dryer, Multnomah & Washington
Legrand J. C. Duncan, Jackson
Luther Elkins, Linn
William H. Farrar, Multnomah
Solomon Fitzhugh, Douglas
La Fayette Grover, Marion
Sidney B. Hendershott, Josephine
Enoch Hoult, Lane
James K. Kelly, Clackamas
John Kelsay, Benton
Robert Crouch Kinney, Yamhill
Haman Lewis, Benton
David Logan, Multnomah
Asa Lovejoy, Clackamas
Perry B. Marple, Coos
William Matzger, Benton
John R. McBride, Yamhill
Stephen McCormick, Multnomah
Charles Meigs, Wasco
Richard Miller, Marion
Isaac R. Moores, Lane
Daniel Newcomb, Jackson
Henry B. Nichols, Benton
Martin Olds, Yamhill
Cyrus Olney, Clatsop
William H. Packwood, Curry
John C. Peebles, Marion
Paine Page Prim, Jackson
John H. Reed, Jackson
Nathaniel Robbins, Clackamas
Levi Scott, Umpqua
Davis Shannon, Marion
Erasmus D. Shattuck, Washington
James Shields, Linn
Robert V. Short, Yamhill
Nicholas Shrum, Marion
Delazon Smith, Linn
William A. Starkweather, Clackamas
William H. Watkins, Josephine
John W. Watts, Columbia
Frederick Waymire, Polk
John S. White, Washington
Thomas Whitted, Douglas
George Henry Williams, Marion

Further development

On November 9, 1857, the voters approved the document to serve as a state constitution upon statehood. At this same vote, measures to allow slavery and to allow free Blacks to live in the state were defeated after they had been submitted as separate items to vote on by the convention. The vote to approve the constitution by the citizens of Oregon was 7,195 for the constitution and 3,215 against the document. The vote on slavery was 2,645 to allow slavery and 7,727 to make it illegal, and the vote to make it illegal for Blacks to live in the state was 8,640 to ban them and 1,081 to allow them to live in the state. All white men over the age of 21 were allowed to vote, and after the passage a delegation was sent east to Washington, D.C. to press for statehood.

Oregon then waited on the United States Congress to accept the constitution and approve Oregon for statehood. Due to the ongoing debate over slavery in the country as the nation approached the American Civil War, the U.S. Senate did not pass legislation to bring Oregon into the Union until 1859, when Oregon became the 33rd state on February 14. The Oregon Constitution was not altered until 1902.

Footnotes

Further reading

The Oregon Constitution and Proceedings and Debates of the Constitutional Convention of 1857 by Charles Henry Carey. State Printing Department, 1926.
Oregon Blue Book: 1857 Oregon Constitution
State of Oregon Law Library: Category: Constitutional Law
During the Convention, Oregon State Archives

Constitutional Convention
Constitutional Convention
 
1857 in American law
1857 in the United States
American constitutional conventions
1857 in Oregon Territory